Belinda McKeon (born 1979) is an Irish writer. She is the author of two novels, Solace, which won the 2011 Geoffrey Faber Memorial Prize, and Tender (2015).

Life and work
McKeon was born in Longford and attended Trinity College, Dublin, and University College, Dublin (UCD). From 2000 to 2010 she worked for The Irish Times, writing on theatre, literature and the arts. In 2005 she moved to New York City, where she completed an MFA at Columbia University.

McKeon's first novel, Solace, won the Geoffrey Faber Memorial Prize and the Sunday Independent Best Newcomer Award and was named Bord Gáis Energy Irish Book of the Year in 2011, as well as being shortlisted for the James Tait Black Memorial Prize. The Economist called Solace "a warm and wise debut", while The Irish Times described it as "at once a moving and gracefully etched story of human loss and interconnection set in contemporary Ireland and a deeply affecting meditation on being in the world".

Her second novel Tender was published in 2015 to critical acclaim. Reviewing it for the Irish Times, author John Boyne called Tender "the best Irish novel I've read since The Spinning Heart, a work rich with wisdom, truth and beauty.", while the Guardian called it "richly nuanced and utterly absorbing." Tender was shortlisted for Novel of the Year at the 2015 Irish Book Awards.

In 2015, McKeon edited A Kind of Compass: Stories on Distance, a collection of new short stories on the theme of distance by 17 international contemporary writers The collection is published by Tramp Press.

McKeon is also a playwright and her produced plays include Word of Mouth (an RTE radio drama, 2005), Drapes (Dublin, 2006), and Graham and Frost (Irish Theatre Festival, New York, 2010).

From 2008 to 2011, she curated the DLR Poetry Now Festival in Dún Laoghaire, County Dublin, Ireland, and, with her husband Aengus Woods, she has curated the annual Poetry Fest at the Irish Arts Center, New York, since 2009. 

In 2022 McKeon became the head of Maynooth University's Master of Arts in Creative Writing. She previously was Associate Teaching Professor in Creative Writing at Rutgers University

List of works

Novels
 Solace (Picador, 2011); (Scribner, 2011)
 Tender (Picador, 2015); (Lee Boudreaux, 2016)

Plays
 Word of Mouth (RTE radio drama, 2005)
 Drapes (part of Fishamble Theatre Company's Whereabouts, Dublin, 2006)
 Two Houses (one of two plays in Love 2.0, a Dublin Fringe Festival production in association with the Abbey Theatre, 2008)
 Graham and Frost (1st Irish Theater Festival, New York, 2010)
 Dropping Slow (RTE radio drama, 2012)

Editor
 A Kind of Compass: Stories on Distance (Tramp Press, 2015)

Awards
 2005 RTE PJ O'Connor Radio Drama Award for Word of Mouth
 2006 Irish Theatre Award for Drapes as part of Fishamble Theatre Company's Whereabouts
 2008 Dublin Fringe Festival Audience Choice Award for Two Houses as part of Love 2.0, along with Philip McMahon's Investment Potential
 2011 Sunday Independent Best Newcomer Award at the Irish Book Awards for Solace
 2011 Irish Book of the Year at the Irish Book Awards for Solace
 2011 Geoffrey Faber Memorial Prize for Solace
 2012 Shortlist for the James Tait Black Memorial Prize for Solace
 2012 Shortlist for the Kerry Group Irish Novel of the Year for Solace
 2015 Shortlist for the Eason Bookclub Novel of the Year at the Irish Book Awards for Tender
 2015 Shortlist for Encore Award for best second novel for Tender.

References

External links
Official Website
Irish Times interview with Belinda McKeon
Guardian review of Tender
Rutgers University profile

1979 births
Living people
Irish writers
Irish dramatists and playwrights
Columbia University School of the Arts alumni